The Kerala football team (Malayalam: കേരള കാൽപന്തുകളി ഗണം) is an Indian state level football team representing Kerala in Indian state football competitions including the Santosh Trophy. They have appeared in the Santosh Trophy finals 15 times, and have won the trophy 7 times. Kerala last won the Santhosh Trophy in 2022 by defeating Bengal in the final on 2 May at the Payyanadu Stadium in Malappuram. The Kerala team was captained by Jijo Joseph under head coach Bino George, being unbeaten during the tournament.

Players

Current squad
As of 03 February 2023:

Current technical staff
As of 03 February 2023

Results and Fixtures

Statistics and records

Season-by-season

 Champions   Runners-up   Third place

Honours

State
Santosh Trophy
 Winners (7): 1973–74, 1991–92, 1992–93, 2001–02, 2004–05, 2017–18, 2021–2022
 Runners-up (8): 1987–88, 1988–89, 1989–90, 1990–91, 1993–94, 1999–2000, 2002–03, 2012–13
National Games
 Gold medal (2): 1987, 1997
 Silver medal (2): 1994, 2022
 B.C. Roy Trophy
 Winners (3): 1968–69, 1971–72, 1972–73
 Runners-up (5): 1973–74, 1974–75, 1979–80, 1981–82, 1985–86
 Mir Iqbal Hussain Trophy
 Winners (2): 1981–82, 1983–84
 M. Dutta Ray Trophy
 Winners (1): 1995

Others
 Sait Nagjee Football Tournament
 Runners-up (1): 1986

References

Football in Kerala
Santosh Trophy teams